The Story of Sim Cheong or The Tale of Shim Ch'ŏng is a Korean classical novel about a filial daughter named Sim Cheong. Simcheongga, the pansori version, performed by a single narrator, is believed to be the older version of the story, with the novel having been adapted from its script. Some examples of the story, though nominally referred to as novels, are practically the same as the pansori libretti, and are thus referred to as "pansori novels".

Woodblock-printed editions, written entirely in Hangul, were issued in the early 20th century. These books, printed in Jeonju (referred to as "Wanpan bon" editions), fall in the "pansori novel" category. The Seoul woodblock editions (called "Gyeongpan bon" editions) assume the more conventional literary style of the novel.

Summary 
Sim Cheong-jeon is a story about the titular Sim Cheong, who throws herself into the Indang Sea as a sacrifice so that her blind father can regain his eyesight. This selfless act of filial piety causes her to be resurrected and become an empress, and her father's blindness is cured.

Literary forms and versions

Genres 
The Tale of Sim Cheong refers to the classical novel (or pansori novel) form of the legend, while the "Simcheongga (Song of Sim Cheong)" refers to p'ansori performed version.

There is also the form performed by the mudang shamanesses at the gut ritual, and the recited text may be referred to as the  "Shamanic Song of Sim Cheong".

Texts 
There are handwritten, woodblock print, and metal-type print editions of Sim Cheong-jeon. And despite the aforementioned convention that the pansori works be distinguished as Sim Cheong ga ("Song") and not be referred to as Sim Cheong jeun ("Story"), The Complete Collection of Sim Cheong jeon (1997) edited by Kim Jinyoung, Kim Hyun Ju, et al. (1997) include p'ansori recordings and libretti also, and amassing 83 variant texts in the compilation.

The woodblock editions are largely divided into three groups: the “Hannam edition” version and the “Songdong edition” version in close-to-prose form, and the “Jeonju edition” version set down in verse.

The Hannam Seolim (1917) edition and Songdong editions were both printed in Seoul, and are collectively known as the Seoul editions version. The Jeonju edition, named after the city, is also called the Wanpan version after Wansan, the archaic name for the city. These Seoul woodblock editions date to pre-1920, while the Wanpan woodblock editions were issued from 1905 to 1916.

Although referred to as novels, many of these (especially Wanpan editions) were virtually theatrical scripts in their style of writing, in fact, they are not much different from the p'ansori libretti. And they are referred to as "p'ansori novels" or "pansori-based novels" for that reason (Cf. §Pansori novel below). More like conventional novels, and written in the "literary style" are the Seoul editions.

Although the woodblock-printed texts are entirely in hangul, there are handwritten transcriptions which supply information on the equivalent Chinese characters.

Content-wise, the major differences among the three versions are: 1) the appearance of a celestial being who comes down to earth (Hannam edition version), 2) the appearance of Bbaengdeok's mother (Songdong edition version), and 3) the appearance of Lady Jang (Jeonju edition version). Generally, the Hannam edition is considered to be the earliest version of Sim Cheong-jeon, followed by the Songdong edition and the Jeonju edition. Sometimes the different editions of Sim Cheong-jeon are grouped by whether the writing style shows characteristics of pansori or written fiction; by the different spellings of the name of Sim Cheong's father; and by the differences in the section featuring Lady Jang. Most handwritten editions of Sim Cheong-jeonare considered to be the Jeonju edition version.

Plot 
A summary of the tale, common to both the Wanpan/Jeonju and Seoul editions, are as follows:

Long ago, northern Korea's Hwangju County had a district named Dohhwa-dong, literally "Peach Blossom Village"), where lived a destitute family descended from the yangban class. The daughter Sim Cheong had Blind Man Sim, full name Sim Hakgyu as father, raising the girl alone after the death of the mother, Lady Gwak.

Blind Man Sim received a tip from a Buddhist monk that he might recover his sight by offering 300  or "sacks" of rice to Buddha, and the Blind Man pledges to do so. In order to pay for this donation, the daughter Sim Cheong (who is now 15 years old) decides to sell herself to sea merchants who plan to sacrifice her to the Indang Sea. But after Sim Cheong throws herself into the water, by the grace of the Jade Emperor she is taken to the Dragon Palace of the Dragon King. She is later sent back up to the terrestrial world, contained inside a lotus flower, and is chosen as the new wife of the Chinese Emperor of the Song Dynasty. Now an empress, Sim Cheong hosts a feast for the blind and reunites with her father. Overjoyed at the reunion with his daughter, Blind Man Sim regains his eyesight.

.

Bbaengdeok's mother 
Bbaengdeok's mother  is a character who appears after Sim Cheong falls into the waters of Indangsu. She swindles Blind Man Sim into marrying her, and steals his money. . On the way to the feast for the blind that Sim Cheong hosts as an empress, Bbaengdeok's mother falls in love with Blind Man Hwang and runs away with him, leaving Sim Cheong's father behind. .

Origins 
The identity of the author is unknown, and the period in which this novel was created is also unknown. Since there is mention of a jeongisu (professional storyteller) reading Sim Cheong-jeon in Chujaejip (秋齋集 Collected Writings of Chujae Jo Susam), written by Jo Susam (趙秀三, 1762–1847), scholars have concluded that Sim Cheong-jeon must have existed as a complete work in the 18th century.

Pansori novel 
There exist examples of the novel that closely resemble the p'ansori version, which are generically called "pansori novels". Hence it has been argued that Sim Cheong novel all derive from p'ansori, however, the converse has been argued as well, some believing that the novel version came before the pansori.

As mentioned earlier, Wanpan versions of the novels in particular are considered "p'ansori novels", and though called the novel, are practically the same as a p'ansori libretto or a script for a play. There are handwritten versions that are examples of "pansori novels" as well.

Folktale hypothesis 
While some commentators consider the novel to be a folktale, detractors have noted that it is not a folktale as such. The folktale hypothesis stipulates that there must have existed a folk narrative about Sim Cheong early on. This later became the p'ansori, Sim Cheong-ga, thence adapted as pansori-based novels, represented by the Wanpan edition group. Meanwhile, the folk narratives may have first developed into novel style, later printed in Seoul woodblock editions, then adapted to (modern) p'ansori, or so it has been explained by one commentator.

Composite of different narratives 
Another school of thought is that the Sim Cheong-jeon as is presently known did not anciently exist as a folk narrative, but was invented as a piece of fiction, cobbling together various plotlines and motifs from narratives recorded in old literature.

Thus the Sim Cheong narrative or novel may have been fictionally invented using source material found in the medieval Korean historical tracts, Samguk sagi and Samguk yusa.

Hyonyeo Jieun seolhwa tells the story of a girl named Jieun who took care of her mother by selling her body. Gwaneumsa yeongi seolhwa is about Won Hongjang who made an offering to the Buddha for her father and later became an empress. After becoming an empress, she sent a statue of Gwaneum to Korea, and Gwaneum Temple was built in Gokseong to house the statue. The Geotaji narrative (Samguk yusa, Book 2) contains closely similar motifs, such as the sacrifice being thrown into a pond, and the dragon transforming into a flower.

According to one analysis (Jung Ha-young 鄭夏英), at the base are three types of narrative or tale-types: tales about regaining eyesight, tales of virgin sacrifice, and heroic tales, with some 17 additional folklore motifs added, such as birth origins and downfall of a blind man.

Cultural references 
This work has been rewritten as modern fiction and poem and also adapted into song, TV show, film, changgeuk (Korean classical opera), opera, musical, madang nori, and children's book.

Ballet 
Shim Chung (October 2019): Universal Ballet held a ballet performance.

Film 
Empress Chung (2005)
Simcheongjeon (1925)
Simcheongjeon (1937)
The Story of Sim Cheong (1962)
The Tale of Shim Chong (1972)
The Tale of Shim Chong (1985): The story was adapted twice on screen by Shin Sang-ok, once in South Korea in 1972, and as The Tale of Shim Chong in 1985 when he and his wife Choi Eun-hee were abducted to North Korea.

Literature 
Gangsangnyeon: This work was also rewritten into a sinsoseol by Yi Hae-jo (1869–1927). Gangsangnyeon was published in 33 installments in Maeil Shinbo from March 17 to April 26, 1912. Yi also adapted Gangsangnyeon into a changgeuk as well (Tale of Sim Cheong, 1912).
I Become the Dragon King's Chef (2017)

Other 
Gokseong Simcheong Children's Grand Festival (2021-): The town of Gokseong in Jeollanam-do hosts the annual Sim Cheong Festival (2001–2020) in an attempt to celebrate Sim Cheong's filial piety and reinterpret the meaning of filial piety in modern society. Gokseong is considered to be the setting for Gwaneunsa yeongi seolhwa, which is known to be the original story on which this work is based.

Theater 
Japgeuk Sim Cheong wanghu-jeon (1907–1908): Yeo Gyu-hyeong (1848–1921) rewrote this work in Chinese characters. This edition was created for a performance at Wongaksa, the first modern Korean theater, and therefore is presumed to have been written sometime between 1907 and 1908, when performances were staged at Wongaksa.
 The Tale of Sim Chong (1993)

Video game 
MapleStory (2003) – Korean Folk Town quests (2006, 2015)

Webtoon 
Baramsori (2014)
Her Tale of Shim Chong (2017)
Shimbongsajeon (2013)

Translations

English 
 J. S. Gale, “The Story of Sim Chung,” Gale, James Scarth Papers, unpublished.
 H. N. Allen, “SIM CHUNG, The Dutiful Daughter,” Korean Tales, New York & London: The Knickerbocker Press, 1889.
 Charles M. Taylor, Winning Buddha's Smile; A Korean Legend, Boston: Goham Press, 1919.
 Hyo-Yun Yun; Hyŏp Lee (illustr.), The story of Shim Ch'ŏng, Kum Sung Publishing Company, 1985
 W. E. Skillend, “The Story of Shim Chung,” Korean Classical Literature: An Anthology, London: Kengan Paul International, 1989.
 Marshall R. Pihl, “The Song of Shim Ch'ŏng,” The Korean Singer of Tales (The Harvard-Yenching Institute Monograph Series, 37), Harvard University Press, 1994.
 Riordan, James. "Blindman's Daughter Shim Chung". Korean Folk-tales. Oxford Myths and Legends. Oxford: Oxford University Press, 2000 [1994]. pp. 4-13.

French 
 Le Bois Sec Refleuri, translated by HONG-TJYONG-OU, Ernest Leroux, 1895.

See also 
 Korean folklore

Explanatory notes

References

Citations

Bibliography 

 

 

 

 

 “Sim Cheong-jeon 심청전 沈淸傳”, 한국민족문화대백과 [Encyclopedia of Korean Culture] 

 “Sim Cheong-ga 심청가 沈淸歌”,  한국민속예술사전 : 음악 [Korean folk art dictionary: music] 

 “Pansoli-gye soseol 판소리계소설 ─系小說” [Pansori-based fiction], 한국민족문화대백과 [Encyclopedia of Korean National Culture]  

 “Pansoli-gye soseol 판소리계 소설” [Pansori-based fiction] , 한국민속문학사전(판소리 편) [National Folk Museum of Korea Dictionary of Folk Literature (pansori edition)]

External links 

 Short version at Telling tales from Southeast Asia and Korea

Buddhist folklore
Korean fairy tales